Ladislas Petre Meyair Douniama (born 24 May 1986) is a Congolese professional footballer who plays for Rostrenen FC.

Club career
Douniama was born in Brazzaville, Congo. He made his senior debut for Nîmes Olympique in Championnat National on 18 December 2004, as a late substitute in a 0–0 away draw at Valenciennes. He scored his first senior goal on 18 February 2015, in a 3–1 home win against Evian Thonon Gaillard F.C. After two seasons with the club, he signed for US Orléans, then in Championnat de France Amateur, during the summer of 2006, in order to get more playing time and progress his career.

After three seasons, he joined Lille OSC in the summer of 2009, signing amateur terms to play with the B side still in Championnat de France Amateur, but with the hope that he could progress to the first team. The professional contract did not materialise at Lille, but on 10 June 2010, he signed a two-year professional deal with Championnat National club En Avant de Guingamp.

Douniama made his professional debut for Guingamp as a second-half substitute on 6 August 2010, in a 1–0 victory over FC Rouen. His first professional goal came two months later, on 2 October 2010, when he scored the opener in the 2–1 away win at FC Gueugnon. Guingamp won promotion to Ligue 2 at the end of Douniama's first season at the club, and while in Ligue 2, he was soon spotted by a number of Ligue 1 clubs. On 27 January 2012, he joined FC Lorient of Ligue 1, signing a three-and-a-half-year contract.

Having made only six league appearances in his first season with Lorient, lack of playing time saw Douniama join AC Arles-Avignon in Ligue 2 on loan for the 2012–13 season. The loan was terminated early in January 2013, as Douniama signed a two-and-a-half-year contract to return to Guingamp, where he contributed to the club's promotion to Ligue 1.

During his two years in the top division with Guingamp, Douniama experienced winning the 2014 Coupe de France Final (as an unused substitute) and playing in the 2014–15 UEFA Europa League. At the end of his contract in the summer of 2015, he left Guingamp, and on 10 September 2015, he signed a two-year contract with RC Strasbourg in Championnat National. The club was champion of the division at the end of the 2015–16 season, but Douniama was not in the plans of the coach the following season, and on 22 September 2016, it was reported that he had joined Saudi Arabian side Al Khaleej.

By January 2017, Douniama was back in France, where he signed a contract until the end of the season with Championnat National side AS Lyon-Duchère. At the end of the season, he was released, and in July was part of the UNFP FC team (a team formed of professional players who are out of contract and looking for a club) that faced Ligue 2 side Chamois Niortais F.C. In late September 2017, Douniama signed a contract with Championnat National 2 side US Granville.

On 24 July 2019, Douniama joined SS Jeanne d'Arc.

International career
Douniama made his international debut for the Congo national football team on 8 June 2008 in Republic of the Congo versus Sudan, a qualification match for the 2010 World Cup. His first international goal came in a friendly in Angola on 14 November 2014. He represented the national team at the 2015 Africa Cup of Nations, where his team advanced to the quarterfinals.

International goals
Scores and results list Congo's goal tally first, score column indicates score after each Douniama goal.

Honours
Guingamp
 Ligue 2: 2012–13
 Coupe de France: 2013–14

Strasbourg
 Championnat National: 2015–16

References

External links
 

1986 births
Living people
Republic of the Congo footballers
Republic of the Congo expatriate footballers
Republic of the Congo international footballers
Republic of the Congo emigrants to France
Nîmes Olympique players
Lille OSC players
En Avant Guingamp players
FC Lorient players
AC Arlésien players
RC Strasbourg Alsace players
Khor Fakkan Sports Club players
Lyon La Duchère players
US Granville players
Stade Briochin players
Ligue 2 players
Ligue 1 players
Championnat National players
Championnat National 2 players
Championnat National 3 players
Expatriate footballers in France
Expatriate footballers in Saudi Arabia
Republic of the Congo expatriate sportspeople in France
Republic of the Congo expatriate sportspeople in Saudi Arabia
Sportspeople from Brazzaville
2015 Africa Cup of Nations players
Association football forwards